A-834,735 is a drug developed by Abbott Laboratories that acts as a potent cannabinoid receptor full agonist at both the CB1 and CB2 receptors, with a Ki of 12 nM at CB1 and 0.21 nM at CB2. Replacing the aromatic 3-benzoyl or 3-naphthoyl group found in most indole derived cannabinoids with the 3-tetramethylcyclopropylmethanone group of A-834,735 and related compounds imparts significant selectivity for CB2, with most compounds from this group found to be highly selective CB2 agonists with little affinity for CB1. However, low nanomolar CB1 binding affinity is retained with certain heterocyclic 1-position substituents such as (N-methylpiperidin-2-yl)methyl (cf. AM-1220, AM-1248), or the (tetrahydropyran-4-yl)methyl substituent of A-834,735, resulting in compounds that still show significant affinity and efficacy at both receptors despite being CB2 selective overall.

Legal status

As of October 2015 A-834,735 is a controlled substance in China.

See also 
 A-796,260
 AB-001
 AB-005
 FUB-144
 JTE 7-31
 UR-144
 XLR-11

References 

Cannabinoids
Tetrahydropyrans
Cyclopropanes
Tetramethylcyclopropanoylindoles